Podglavica may refer to:
 Podglavica, Glamoč, Bosnia and Herzegovina
 Podglavica, Danilovgrad, Montenegro